Live Forever: The Rise and Fall of Brit Pop is a 2003 documentary film written and directed by John Dower. The documentary is a study of popular culture in the United Kingdom during the mid-to-late 1990s. The focus of the piece is the main movement in British popular music during that time, which came under strong media attention and was dubbed Britpop.

The political landscape of the time also features. Much is made of Tony Blair and New Labour's efforts to align themselves with the distinctly British cultural resurgence that was underway. The documentary features a number of prominent UK musical and artistic figures, but relies heavily on contributions from Noel and Liam Gallagher of Oasis, Damon Albarn of Blur, and Jarvis Cocker of Pulp. Other contributors include 3D from Massive Attack, Louise Wener from Sleeper, the fashion designer Ozwald Boateng, and the contemporary artist Damien Hirst.

Live Forever compilation album 
The compilation album Live Forever – The Best of Britpop was issued on the Virgin TV label in conjunction with the documentary's theatrical release. It features songs from the film and other notable artists of the Britpop era.

Track listing

CD 1 
 "Live Forever" – Oasis
 "Common People" – Pulp
 "Parklife" – Blur
 "Alright" – Supergrass
 "Girl From Mars" – Ash
 "Waking Up" – Elastica
 "Mulder and Scully" – Catatonia
 "Finetime" – Cast
 "The Changingman" – Paul Weller
 "Stupid Girl" – Garbage
 "Everything Must Go" – Manic Street Preachers
 "The Riverboat Song" – Ocean Colour Scene
 "Atomic" – Sleeper
 "Tattva" – Kula Shaker
 "Come Back to What You Know" – Embrace
 "Wide Open Space" – Mansun
 "6 Underground" – Sneaker Pimps
 "Female of the Species" – Space
 "You're Gorgeous" – Babybird
 "Angels" – Robbie Williams

CD 2 
 "Protection" – Massive Attack
 "Street Spirit (Fade Out)" – Radiohead
 "Stars" – Dubstar
 "The More You Ignore Me, The Closer I Get" – Morrissey
 "Beautiful Ones" – Suede
 "The Life of Riley" – The Lightning Seeds
 "Inbetweener" – Sleeper
 "King of the Kerb" – Echobelly
 "Getting Better" – Shed Seven
 "Ready to Go" – Republica
 "Setting Sun"  – The Chemical Brothers
 "Nancy Boy" – Placebo
 "Breathe" – The Prodigy
 "Weak" – Skunk Anansie
 "Born Slippy" – Underworld
 "Loaded" – Primal Scream
 "Step On" – Happy Mondays
 "The Only One I Know" – The Charlatans
 "Champagne Supernova" – Oasis

References

External links 
 
 Britpop Movie Holds Première, BBC News, 3 March 2003.

2003 documentary films
2003 films
British documentary films
Britpop
Films produced by John Battsek
Rockumentaries
2000s English-language films
2000s British films